The Al Ahmad Mosque is an Islamic place of worship in Buenos Aires, Argentina, opened in 1985. It is the second oldest mosque in Buenos Aires but it is the oldest building with Islamic architecture in Argentina and it was designed by Ahmed and Elia Ham.

It is located on Alberti St. 1541, San Cristobal neighbourhood. It has a minaret from which the muezzin issues the call for the five daily prays, the dome over the prayer hall also highlights. The Mosque is part of the Islamic Center of Argentina. The Al Ahmad Mosque attends a large number of Muslims on Fridays at noon for Friday Prayers (Jummah), the most important Muslim prayer of the week and hear the sermon delivered by the Imam (Prayer Leader).

The nearby Inclán - Mezquita Al Ahmad station of Line H of the Buenos Aires Underground was partially named after the mosque.

See also

 Islam in Argentina
 List of mosques in Argentina
 List of mosques in the Americas

References

External links

 Official website 

1985 establishments in Argentina
Mosques completed in 1985
Mosques in Argentina
Religious buildings and structures in Buenos Aires